Miles & More is an airline loyalty and frequent flyer program owned and operated by the Lufthansa Group.

Member airlines
The following Lufthansa Group airlines are members of the Miles & More program:
 Lufthansa (since 1993)
 Lufthansa CityLine (since 1993)
 Lufthansa Private Jet
 Air Dolomiti 
 Brussels Airlines (since 2009)
 Austrian Airlines (since 2000)
 Eurowings
 Eurowings Discover
 Swiss International Air Lines (since 2006)

Additionally, the following airlines adopted Miles & More as their sole loyalty program despite not being owned by the Lufthansa Group:
 Croatia Airlines
 LOT Polish Airlines (since 2003)
 Luxair (since 2012)

Furthermore, all member airlines of the Star Alliance, of which Lufthansa is a founding member, accept Miles & More memberships. A few further airlines without the same alliance affiliation recognize the program as well.

Earning miles

There are two types of miles within the program. Award miles that can be collected in the account of a member and be used to buy flights, upgrades, and merchandise from Miles & More partners. Standard Miles & More members retain validity for 36 months, after which they expire. Status miles can only be earned when flying on fully integrated partner airlines or Star Alliance members. There is no other way to earn these miles. In addition, status miles expire at the end of each calendar year. They are used to identify the frequent flyers and members that can qualify for a higher status based on the status miles that they have collected in one year.

There are additionally two special forms of Miles, Select and HON Circle: Select benefits are advantages that can be earned in addition to the status benefits, as part of the program called Miles & More Selections while the status is still valid. Once the member has reached specified mileage levels by flying, additional advantages can be selected. HON Circle miles can only be earned when flying in business or first class on the fully integrated partner airlines and Air-Rail trains in Germany (up to a total of 600,000 miles within two consecutive calendar years). They are necessary to attain the top-tier status on Miles & More – HON Circle.

The miles that a member receives after having completed a flight depend on the Airline issuing ticket, mileage flown, the class of service, and the booking class. There are other ways to collect award miles when not traveling. The Lufthansa Miles & More Credit Card can be subscribed to (which may be issued as a VISA, MasterCard, or American Express card, depending on the country in which it is issued). Award miles can be earned on certain Deutsche Bahn trains, when staying in certain hotels, shopping in certain shops (such as the LH Worldshop), renting cars, investing in certain funds, opening an account with certain banks, picking up a catalogue in a Bang & Olufsen store, and others.

In late 2022, Lufthansa announced that Miles&More will undergo a major revamp from January 2024, restructuring the entire program - besides other major changes, Miles will be replaced with Points which will additionally be calculated differently.

Redeeming miles
Once a member has collected the necessary number of miles, they can be used to buy flights, upgrades and products from the Lufthansa Worldshop.

Miles in a member's account can be exchanged for award flights on all the fully integrated airline partners and all of the Star Alliance carriers. The number of miles that is deducted from the account depends on the origin and destination of that flight. Additional fees and taxes will still apply for award flights (but can be paid by additional miles).  Miles can also be redeemed for upgrades on all fully integrated carriers of Miles & More and on the following Star Alliance partners: All Nippon Airways (ANA), Asiana Airlines, Singapore Airlines, TAP Portugal, Thai Airways International, United Airlines. Again the number of miles required depends on the destination of the flight.

Miles can be redeemed for a rental car, hotel, shopping, banks & insurance, telecommunications & electronics industries, etc. Members of the program also earn award miles when paying for their purchases with their Miles & More credit card.

Status
On Miles & More, all customers can build status by collecting status miles. The status miles from 1 year only count towards status. There are four status levels on Miles & More:

Miles & More member: This is the entry status that a customer receives after they join the program. This status does not receive any officially documented privileges. A Miles & More member starts with a temporary paper card, which is usually cut out from one of the Lufthansa magazines or printed from the internet; a plastic card is sent once the member has credited at least one award mile to their Miles & More account.

Frequent Traveller: The frequent traveler card is given to all Miles & More customers that received a total of over 35,000 status miles or had 30 flights. This status remains valid for two years and a member can requalify in any one of those two years. 

Senator: Having collected 100,000 Status Miles within one calendar year, Miles & More members will receive "Senator" Status with a validity of at least two years.

HON Circle: Having collected 600,000 HON Circle Miles within two calendar years, Miles & More members receive HON Circle Status with validity of two years.

References

External links
 Official website

Lufthansa
Frequent flyer programs
1993 establishments in Germany